The Langental Formation, also spelled as Langetal Formation, is a Late Eocene (Bartonian to Priabonian) geologic formation cropping out in the Sperrgebiet, ǁKaras Region of southwestern Namibia. The siltstones and sandstones of the formation were deposited in a shallow marine environment. The Langental Formation was deposited under hot and humid conditions. The formation overlies the Silica Beds unit and is overlain by the Blaubok Conglomerate. The Langental Formation provides many fossil invertebrates and fish.

Fossil content 
Among others, the following fossils are reported from the formation:

Fish

 Alopecias smithwoodwardi
 Carcharias (Aprionodon) frequens
 Carcharias (Physodon) quartus
 Carcharodon hastalis
 Cestracion vincenti
 Chrysophrys blankenhorni	
 Cylindracanthus cf. rectus	
 Galeocerdo latidens
 Galeus porrectus, G. robustus
 Isurus desorii
 Labrodon stromeri
 Lamna barnitzkei, L. vincenti
 Myliobatis cf. dixoni	
 Notidanus serratissimus
 Odontaspis contortidens, O. macrota, O. winkleri
 Odontorhytis pappenheimi
 Oxypristis ferinus
 Paranarrhichas damesi
 Pimelodus cf. gaudryi
 Rhinoptera rasilis
 Sphyraenodus hastatus
 Squatina prima

See also 
 List of fossiliferous stratigraphic units in Namibia
 Geology of Namibia
 Elisabeth Bay Formation

References

Bibliography

Further reading 
 J. Bohm. 1926. Über Tertiäre versteinerungen von den Bogenfelser diamantfeldern. Beiträge zur geologischen Erforschung der deutschen Schutzgebiete 2:55-87

Geologic formations of Namibia
Eocene Series of Africa
Bartonian Stage
Priabonian Stage
Siltstone formations
Sandstone formations
Paleontology in Namibia
Geography of ǁKaras Region